A pura is a Balinese Hindu temple, and the place of worship for adherents of Balinese Hinduism in Indonesia. Puras are built in accordance to rules, style, guidance and rituals found in Balinese architecture. Most puras are found on the island of Bali, where Hinduism is the predominant religion; however many puras exist in other parts of Indonesia where significant numbers of Balinese people reside. Mother Temple of Besakih is the most important, largest and holiest temple in Bali. Many puras have been built in Bali, leading it to be titled "the Island of a Thousand Puras".

Etymology 

The term pura originates from the Sanskrit word (-pur, -puri, -pura, -puram, -pore), meaning "city", "walled city", "towered city", or "palace", which was adopted with the Indianization of Southeast Asia and the spread of Hinduism, specially in the Indosphere. During the development of the Balinese language the term pura came to refer to a religious temple complex, while the term puri came to refer to palace, the residence of kings and nobles, similar to Javanese kratons.

Design and layout

Unlike the common towering indoor Hindu temples of the Indian Subcontinent, puras are designed as an open air place of worship within enclosed walls, connected with a series of intricately decorated gates between its compounds. These walled compounds contain several shrines, meru (towers), and bale (pavilions). The design, plan and layout of the pura follows the trimandala concept of Balinese space allocation. Three mandala zones arranged according to a sacred hierarchy:
 Nista mandala (jaba pisan): the outer zone, which directly connects the pura compound with the outer realm, and the entrance to the temple. This zone usually takes the form of an open field or a garden that can be used for religious dance performances, or act as an additional space for preparations during religious festivals.
 Madya mandala (jaba tengah): the middle zone of the temple, where the activity of adherents takes place, and also the location for supporting facilities of the temple. In this zone usually several pavilions are built, such as the bale kulkul (wooden Slit drum tower), bale gong (gamelan pavilion), wantilan (meeting pavilion), bale pesandekan, and bale perantenan, the temple's kitchen. 
 Utama mandala (jero): the holiest and the most sacred zone within the pura. This enclosed and typically highest of the compounds usually contains a padmasana, the towering lotus throne of the highest god, Acintya (the Sang Hyang Widhi Wasa, or "All-in-one God", in modern Balinese), the pelinggih meru (a multi-tiered tower-shrine), and several pavilions, such as bale pawedan (vedic chanting pavilion), bale piyasan, bale pepelik (offering pavilion), bale panggungan, bale murda, and gedong penyimpenan (storehouse of the temple's relics).

However, the layout rules for arrangements the facilities of the two outer zones, nista mandala and madya mandala, are somewhat flexible. Several structures, such as the bale kulkul, could be built as outer corner tower; also, the perantenan (temple kitchen) could be located in the Nista mandala.

Gates 

There are two types of gates within Balinese architecture: the split gate, known as candi bentar, and the roofed tower gate known as paduraksa or kori agung. Both types of gates have specific roles in Balinese architectural design. Candi bentar is the gate used in the nista mandala, while the kori agung is employed as the gate between the madya mandala and Utama mandala inner compounds. The rules for gate types are also valid for non-religious compounds such as puri, nobles' and kings' residences.

Types of pura 
There are several types of pura, each serving certain functions of Balinese rituals throughout the Balinese calendar. The Balinese temples are arranged according to the physical and spiritual realm of Balinese people, which corresponds to kaja-kelod sacred axis, from mountain tops the realms of gods, hyang spirits, the middle fertile plain the realm of humans and other beings, all the way to the beach and ocean, and the many realms in Indonesia. 
 Pura kahyangan jagad Pura that are located in the mountainous region of the island, built upon mountain or volcano slopes. The mountains are considered as the sacred magical and haunted realm, the abode of gods or hyang. The most important pura kahyangan in Bali is Mother Temple of Besakih complex on the slopes of Mount Agung. Another example is Pura Parahyangan Agung Jagatkarta on slopes of Mount Salak, West Java.
 Pura tirta "Water temples", a type of pura that other than religious function, also have water management function as part of Subak irrigation system. The priests in these temples have authority to manage the water allocation among rice paddies in the villages surrounds the temple. Some tirta temples are noted for its sacred water and having petirtaan or sacred bathing pool for cleansing ritual. Other water temple are built within lakes, such as Pura Ulun Danu Bratan. The best example of this type of temple is Pura Tirta Empul.
 Pura desa A type of pura dedicated to the worship of Brahma the Gods and deities, that are located within villages or cities, serving as the center of Balinese people's religious activities.
 Pura puseh A type of pura dedicated to the worship of Vishnu.
 Pura dalem A type of pura dedicated to the worship of Shiva, Durga, Mother nature, Banaspatiraja (barong), Sang Bhuta Diyu, Sang Bhuta Garwa, and other deities, Usually Shiva's shakti, Durga, is venerated in this temple. In human life cycle, the temple is connected to rituals concerning death. It is also common for a pura dalem to have a big tree like a banyan tree or a kepuh which is usually also used as a shrine. The Pura Dalem is typically located next to the graveyard of the deceased prior to ngaben (cremation) ceremony.
 Pura mrajapati A type of pura to worship prajapati (the lord of people) or the cosmic might. Most often, in this temple Shiva is worshipped in his form as prajapati.
 Pura segara "Sea temples", a pura that are located by the sea to appease the sea Gods and deities. It is usually important during the Melasti ritual. One example of this type of temple is Pura Tanah Lot and Pura Uluwatu.

Sad Kahyangan 
The Sad Kahyangan, Sad Kahyangan Jagad or the "six sanctuaries of the world" are the six holiest places of worship on Bali. According to Balinese beliefs, they are the pivotal points of the island, and are meant to provide spiritual balance to Bali. The number of these most sacred sanctuaries always adds up six, but depending on the region, the specific temples that are listed may vary. A list of the Sad Kahyangan may include:

 Pura Besakih in Karangasem, the "mother temple" of Bali and almost always included
 Pura Lempuyang Luhur in Karangasem
 Pura Goa Lawah in Klungkung
 Pura Luhur Uluwatu in Badung
 Pura Luhur Batukaru in Tabanan 
 Pura Pusering Jagat (Pura Puser Tasik) in Gianyar

Dang Kahyangan
Based on the ejection of Dwijendra Tattwa, which in this study was determined as Dang Hyang Nirartha's history, which in Balinese society is commonly called the History of Gede, mentioned Pura Parama Dharma, which is to pretend that Dang Kahyangan was built by Dang Hyang Nirartha or was awakened by the community to respecting and remembering Dharmayatra (religious holy journey) Dang Hyang Nirartha mentioned a number of 34 temples, some of them:

 Pura Yeh Jeruk in Gianyar
 Pura Pekendungan near Tanah Lot in Tabanan
 Pura Dalem Sakenan on Serangan island
 Pura Tirta Empul in Tampaksiring
 Pura Penataran Sasih in Pejeng
 Pura Dasar Bhuana in Gelgel
 Pura Kehen in Bangli

Sea Temples 

Bali has a number of important "sea temples" (Balinese: pura segara), which were founded in the 16th century by a Majapahit Brahmin from Java, named Nirartha, to honour the gods of the sea. Each of the temples is traditionally said to be visible from the next, forming a 'chain' around the coast of Bali. Many of the most important sea temples are located along the south-west coast of the island. The temples' positions were meant to provide a chain of spiritual protection for the Bali island.

Listed counterclockwise from Nirartha's legendary point of arrival in Bali, some of the most prominent Balinese sea temples include:

 Pura Pulaki near Pemuteran, northeast of Gilimanuk.
 Pura Gede Perancak, to the south of Negara.
 Pura Rambut Siwi, to the east of Negara At this site Nirartha is said to have made a gift of a lock of his hair, which was worshipped. Rambut Siwi translates as 'worship of the hair' and the tale is reminiscent of the Buddhist story of Gautama giving eight hairs to Tapussa and Bhallika, which are now enshrined at Shwedagon.
 Pura Tanah Lot, west of Canggu and south of Tabanan city where two puras were built on a coastal rock overlooking the Indian Ocean as the shrine to honor sea deities..
 Pura Luhur Uluwatu, at the southwestern extremity of the Bukit Peninsula. This is the only Balinese sea temple that is also one of the six Balinese directional temples.
 Pura Mas Suka, at the southern tip of the Bukit Peninsula, near Greenbowl Beach.
 Pura Sakenan on Serangan island, an island between Tanjung Benoa and Sanur.

See also 

 Balinese architecture
 Pura Besakih
 Candi of Indonesia
 Dambana
 List of Hindu temples in Indonesia

Notes

References 
 Sudharta, Tjok. Rai. Beda Sadkahyangan dengan Sadwinayaka, Kolom Tatwa. Majalah Sarad Bali, Ed. No. 69/Tahun VII, Januari 2006.

External links 
 Balinese Temples (Mapview) at Bali.com
 Pura Besakih (description) at footprint guides 
 Pura Penataran Agung (layout) Rough Guide to Bali & Lombok

Balinese culture
Hindu temples
Hindu temples in Indonesia
Balinese sea temples
 
Bali
Balinese